Frondicola is a fungal genus in the Hyponectriaceae family and Xylariales order. It was formerly placed in the  Annulatascaceae family of the Ascomycota. This is a monotypic genus, containing the single species Frondicola tunitricuspis, described as new to science by mycologist Kevin Hyde in 1992.

References

Monotypic Sordariomycetes genera